Macrocyprididae is a family of crustaceans belonging to the order Podocopida.

Genera

Genera:
 Macrocypria Sars, 1923
 Macrocyprina Triebel, 1960
 Macrocypris Brady, 1867

References

Podocopida